Fuzhou (137) is a Type 956E destroyer of the People's Liberation Army Navy.

Development and design 

The project began in the late 1960s when it was becoming obvious to the Soviet Navy that naval guns still had an important role, particularly in support of amphibious landings, but existing gun cruisers and destroyers were showing their age. A new design was started, employing a new  automatic gun turret.

The Chinese People's Liberation Army Navy Surface Force (PLAN) had two modified Sovremenny-class destroyers delivered in December 1999 and November 2000. In 2002, the PLAN ordered two improved versions designated 956-EM. The first vessel was launched in late 2005, while the second was launched in 2006. All four vessels were commissioned to the East Sea Fleet. 

The project cost was 600 million US$ (mid-1990s price) for Project 956E (two ships), and 1.4 billion US$ (early-2000s price) for Project 956EM (two ships).

Construction and career 
Fuzhou was laid down on 22 April 1989 and launched on 16 April 1999 by Severnaya Verf in Saint Petersburg. She was commissioned on 20 November 2000.

References 

1999 ships
Ships built at Severnaya Verf
Sovremenny-class destroyers